Bitpanda GmbH is an Austrian company headquartered in Vienna. Bitpanda's mobile app provides access to its trading platform, which provides a cryptocurrency exchange, commodities and  securities trading, and ETFs. In 2021, Bitpanda achieved a valuation of over four billion US dollars and had nearly 2.7 million customers and almost 500 employees.

On June 24th 2022, the company announced layoffs of 35% of its workforce despite stating internally that they would not do so weeks prior.

History 
The company was founded in 2014 by Eric Demuth, Paul Klanschek, and Christian Trummer. The company was first called Coinimal and changed its name to Bitpanda in 2016. In 2018, an office was opened in London. Initially, Bitpanda was a platform on which only cryptocurrencies were traded. In 2019, it also launched trading in precious metals and in April 2021, it launched trading in securities.

In September 2020, the company raised $52 million in an initial funding round. Investors included Peter Thiel's investment firm. In early 2021, the company partnered with Visa to introduce a credit card that people could use to pay for goods and services in cryptocurrency or commodities in stores.

In another round of funding in August 2021, the company raised $260 million, increasing its valuation to more than $4 billion. In 2021, the company announced it would open an office in Berlin.

Products 
Bitpanda's offerings include trading in cryptocurrencies such as Bitcoin or Ethereum, commodities such as silver and gold, and various securities and funds. Cryptocurrencies can be stored in a digital wallet on Bitpanda's platform and can also be sent to other users. In addition, the company also offers its own credit card.

References 

Bitcoin exchanges
Digital currency exchanges
Austrian companies established in 2014
Companies based in Vienna
Financial services companies established in 2014
Online brokerages
Financial services companies of Austria